Ilona Hlaváčková (born March 15, 1977) is a backstroke swimmer and Olympian from the Czech Republic. She competed at the 2000 and 2004 Olympics.

At the 2001 Short Course European Championships, she set the then European records in the 50 m and 100 m backstroke (27.06 and 57.75).

See also
List of European records in swimming
List of Czech records in swimming

References

1977 births
Living people
Female backstroke swimmers
Czech female swimmers
Swimmers at the 2000 Summer Olympics
Swimmers at the 2004 Summer Olympics
Olympic swimmers of the Czech Republic
World Aquatics Championships medalists in swimming
Medalists at the FINA World Swimming Championships (25 m)
European Aquatics Championships medalists in swimming
Universiade medalists in swimming
Universiade gold medalists for the Czech Republic
Universiade bronze medalists for the Czech Republic
Medalists at the 1999 Summer Universiade
Medalists at the 2001 Summer Universiade
Medalists at the 2003 Summer Universiade